Ellvana Curo (born 22 January 1992), nicknamed "Elly", is a Kosovan-born Albanian footballer who plays for Bundoora United in the Victorian Women's Premier League and the Albania women's national team. She is a tall and strong target striker who rarely gets pushed off the ball.

See also
List of Albania women's international footballers

References

See also
 OzFootball's Victorian League Archive

1992 births
Living people
Albanian women's footballers
Women's association football midfielders
Women's association football forwards
Albania women's international footballers
Kosovan women's footballers
Kosovan people of Albanian descent
Sportspeople of Albanian descent
Kosovan emigrants to Australia
Naturalised citizens of Australia
Soccer players from Melbourne
Australian women's soccer players
Australian people of Albanian descent